is a railway station in the city of Aisai, Aichi Prefecture, Japan, operated by Meitetsu.

Lines

Station layout
The station has a single island platform, connected to the station building by a level crossing. The platforms can accommodate trains of only up to six carriages. The station has automated ticket machines, Manaca automated turnstiles and is unattended.

Platforms

Adjacent stations

|-
!colspan=5|Nagoya Railroad

Station history
Hibino Station was opened on December 19, 1907 as a station on the privately held Bisai Railroad, which was purchased by Meitetsu on August 1, 1925 becoming the Meitetsu Bisai Line. The station has been unattended since July 2005.

Passenger statistics
In fiscal 2017, the station was used by an average of 3,721 passengers daily (boarding passengers only).

Surrounding area
Tsushima High School

See also
 List of Railway Stations in Japan

References

External links

 Official web page 

Railway stations in Japan opened in 1907
Railway stations in Aichi Prefecture
Stations of Nagoya Railroad
Aisai, Aichi